Rabaul Airport, also called Tokua Airport,  is an airport serving Kokopo and Rabaul, the current and former capitals of East New Britain Province on New Britain island in Papua New Guinea.

Before the 1994 volcanic eruption destroyed the town of Rabaul, the airport was at the foot of Tavurvur volcano, near Matupit island. The airport was destroyed by the eruption, and subsequently the new airport was built and opened at Tokua, on the opposite side of the Rabaul caldera.

A volcano eruption closed the airport for a day in 2006.

Facilities 

Airlines and destinations

References

External links
 

Airports in Papua New Guinea
East New Britain Province